Fred Everette Teague III or Trey Teague (born December 27, 1974 in Jackson, Tennessee) is a former American football center. Teague was a seventh round pick out of the University of Tennessee in the 1998 NFL Draft by the Denver Broncos.

Denver Broncos
Trey Teague played for the Broncos from 1998 to 2001. In 2001, he became their starting left offensive tackle in all 16 games.

Buffalo Bills
Teague went to the Bills in 2002, becoming their starting center in place of Bill Conaty. There he stayed for three more years, up to 2005. In 2006, he was replaced by Melvin Fowler.

New York Jets
On February 21, 2007, Teague was released by the New York Jets, the last team with which he was signed.

References

1974 births
Living people
People from Jackson, Tennessee
American football centers
Tennessee Volunteers football players
Denver Broncos players
Buffalo Bills players
New York Jets players